Karen Symons (born 19 February 1967) is a South African former field hockey player who competed in the 2000 Summer Olympics.

References

External links

1967 births
Living people
South African female field hockey players
Olympic field hockey players of South Africa
Field hockey players at the 2000 Summer Olympics